Chrysosturmia is a genus of bristle flies in the family Tachinidae.

Species
Chrysosturmia orbitalis Townsend, 1916

Distribution
Brazil.

References

Exoristinae
Tachinidae genera
Endemic fauna of Brazil
Diptera of South America
Monotypic Brachycera genera
Taxa named by Charles Henry Tyler Townsend